

World Championships

The World Road Championships were held in Ponferrada, Spain, from 21 to 28 September 2014.

Grand Tours

UCI World Tour

2.HC Category Races

1.HC Category Races

UCI tours

Continental Championships

African Championships

Asian Championships

European Championships (under-23)

Oceania Championships

Pan American Championships

World University Cycling Championship

International Games

Asian Games

Central American and Caribbean Games

Commonwealth Games

South American Games

South Asian Games

Summer Youth Olympics

National Championships

UCI Teams

UCI ProTeams

UCI Professional Continental and Continental teams

References

See also
2014 in women's road cycling

 

Men's road cycling by year